Luis Ángel Firpo (October 11, 1894 – August 7, 1960) was an Argentine boxer. Born in Junín, Argentina, he was nicknamed The Wild Bull of the Pampas.

Boxing career
In 1917, Firpo began his professional boxing career by beating Frank Hagney by a decision in six in Buenos Aires. Originally declared a no decision, the bout's result was later changed to a win for Firpo.

For his second bout, he traveled, in January 1918, to Montevideo, Uruguay, where he suffered his first defeat, a first round knockout at the hands of Angel Rodriguez. He put a string of six wins in a row after that, and so on November 1, 1919, he found himself challenging Dave Mills in Santiago, for the South American Heavyweight title. He lost on that occasion by a decision in 15 rounds, but then came back with a win over Andres Balsa by a knockout in round six.

On April 20, 1920, he and Mills had a rematch and Firpo won the title with a first-round knockout. After one more win, he and Mills faced each other in a rubber match, and the result was the same as that of their second bout: Firpo the winner by a knockout in the first. In 1921, the quality of Firpo's challengers improved, when he defeated fringe contender Gunboat Smith twice, the first by decision in 12 and the second by knockout, also in 12.

In 1922, he continued his rise in the Heavyweight rankings by winning all four of his fights by a knockout.

Firpo began 1923 by knocking out former title challenger Bill Brennan in the 12th round. He followed that with seven more wins in a row, including wins over Jack McAuliffe and former world champion Jess Willard. After a win against Charlie Weinert, Firpo challenged world heavyweight champion Jack Dempsey at New York City on September 14, becoming the first Latin American in history to challenge for the title.

Firpo was floored seven times in the first round of the bout, before he trapped Dempsey against the ropes and launched a combination that sent the champion out of the ring. Dempsey hit his head against a writer's typing machine, and for a moment, it looked as if Firpo would become world Heavyweight champion. But Dempsey was helped into the ring at the count of nine (in spite of having been seventeen seconds outside the ring; fighters are given a twenty-second count when they are knocked through the ropes) and he eventually knocked out Firpo in the second round. This fight has been regarded by critics and experts as one of the greatest fights in history. Boxing historian Bert Sugar called it the greatest fight in the history of the sport. Despite losing, Firpo gained substantial fame all over Latin America after this bout, as many people in different parts of that region spoke about his feat of dropping Dempsey. This fight remained so inspirational that, for instance, it led to the naming of the Salvadorian football club C.D. Luis Ángel Firpo.

In 1924, Firpo won his first three fights by knockout, but then lost his last two by decision, the last to legendary challenger Harry Wills.

He retired for a short period, but came back in 1926 to beat Erminio Spalla by a decision in ten. Then, he kept away from the fight game for nine years, but he attempted another comeback in 1936, winning two fights before being beaten by a knockout in three by future Joe Louis challenger Arturo Godoy.  Firpo finally retired after compiling a record of 32 wins and 6 losses in 38 fights, with 26 wins by knockout.

Retirement
Afterwards, Firpo became a car-dealer for Stutz and a rancher.
By 1940 he was ranching on a large scale in Carlos Casares with 8,000 cattle, 4,000 sheep and 400 horses.
He discovered the boxer Abel Cestac in July 1940.
Firpo and Jack Dempsey agreed to jointly manage Cestac, who went on to become the South American heavyweight champion.
On his passing in 1960, Luis Firpo was buried in La Recoleta Cemetery in Buenos Aires. His mausoleum has a statue of him at the front.

Legacy

Firpo's popularity around Latin America was immeasurable. Years later, C.D. Luis Ángel Firpo, a professional football team in El Salvador, was named after him. In addition, various schools, streets, and avenues across Latin America have been named after him.

In 2003, he was named by The Ring as one of the 100 greatest punchers of all time.

Professional boxing record

| style="text-align:center;" colspan="8"|31 Wins (26 Knockouts), 4 Defeats, 2 No Contests
|-  style="text-align:center; background:#e3e3e3;"
|  style="border-style:none none solid solid; "|Res.
|  style="border-style:none none solid solid; "|Record
|  style="border-style:none none solid solid; "|Opponent
|  style="border-style:none none solid solid; "|Type
|  style="border-style:none none solid solid; "|Rd., Time
|  style="border-style:none none solid solid; "|Date
|  style="border-style:none none solid solid; "|Location
|  style="border-style:none none solid solid; "|Notes
|- align=center
|Loss
|31-4, 
|align=left| Arturo Godoy
|
|
|
|align=left|
|align=left|
|- align=center
|Win
|31-3, 
|align=left| Siska Habarta
|
|
|
|align=left|
|align=left|
|- align=center
|Win
|30-3, 
|align=left| Saverio Grizzo
|
|
|
|align=left|
|align=left|
|- align=center
|Win
|29-3, 
|align=left| Erminio Spalla
|
|
|
|align=left|
|align=left|
|- align=center
|style="background:#ddd;"|ND
|28-3, 
|align=left| Charley Weinert
|
|
|
|align=left|
|align=left|
|- align=center
|style="background:#ddd;"|ND
|28-3, 
|align=left| Harry Wills
|
|
|
|align=left|
|align=left|
|- align=center
|Win
|28-3
|align=left| Al Reich
|
|
|
|align=left|
|align=left|
|- align=center
|Win
|27-3
|align=left| Erminio Spalla
|
|
|
|align=left|
|align=left|
|- align=center
|Win
|26-3
|align=left| Farmer Lodge
|
|
|
|align=left|
|align=left|
|- align=center
|Loss
|25-3
|align=left| Jack Dempsey
|
|
|
|align=left|
|align=left|
|- align=center
|Win
|25-2
|align=left| Charley Weinert
|
|
|
|align=left|
|align=left|
|- align=center
|Win
|24-2
|align=left| Homer Smith
|
|
|
|align=left|
|align=left|
|- align=center
|Win
|23-2
|align=left| Joe Burke
|
|
|
|align=left|
|align=left|
|- align=center
|Win
|22-2
|align=left| Jess Willard
|
|
|
|align=left|
|align=left|
|- align=center
|Win
|21-2
|align=left| Jim Hibbard
|
|
|
|align=left|
|align=left|
|- align=center
|Win
|20-2
|align=left| Jack Herman
|
|
|
|align=left|
|align=left|
|- align=center
|Win
|19-2
|align=left| Jack McAuliffe II
|
|
|
|align=left|
|align=left|
|- align=center
|Win
|18-2
|align=left| Bill Brennan
|
|
|
|align=left|
|align=left|
|- align=center
|Win
|17-2
|align=left| Jim Tracey
|
|
|
|align=left|
|align=left|
|- align=center
|Win
|16-2
|align=left| Jack Herman
|
|
|
|align=left|
|align=left|
|- align=center
|Win
|15-2
|align=left| Joe McCann
|
|
|
|align=left|
|align=left|
|- align=center
|Win
|14-2
|align=left| Tom Maxted
|
|
|
|align=left|
|align=left|
|- align=center
|Win
|13-2
|align=left| Fernando Priano
|
|
|
|align=left|
|align=left|
|- align=center
|Win
|12-2
|align=left| Gunboat Smith
|
|
|
|align=left|
|align=left|
|- align=center
|Win
|11-2
|align=left| Gunboat Smith
|
|
|
|align=left|
|align=left|
|- align=center
|Win
|10-2
|align=left| Dave Mills
|
|
|
|align=left|
|align=left|
|- align=center
|style="background:#ddd;"|NC
|9-2
|align=left| Alberto Coleman
|
|
|
|align=left|
|align=left|
|- align=center
|Win
|9-2
|align=left| Antonio Jirsa
|
|
|
|align=left|
|align=left|
|- align=center
|Win
|8-2
|align=left| Dave Mills
|
|
|
|align=left|
|align=left|
|- align=center
|Win
|7-2
|align=left| Andrés Balsa
|
|
|
|align=left|
|align=left|
|- align=center
|Loss
|6-2
|align=left| Dave Mills
|
|
|
|align=left|
|align=left|
|- align=center
|Win
|6-1
|align=left| Arthur Manning
|
|
|
|align=left|
|align=left|
|- align=center
|Win
|5-1
|align=left| Fernando Priano
|
|
|
|align=left|
|align=left|
|- align=center
|Win
|4-1
|align=left| Calvin Respress
|
|
|
|align=left|
|align=left|
|- align=center
|Win
|3-1
|align=left| Calvin Respress
|
|
|
|align=left|
|align=left|
|- align=center
|Win
|2-1
|align=left| Ignacio Sepulveda
|
|
|
|align=left|
|align=left|
|- align=center
|Win
|1-1
|align=left| William Daly
|
|
|
|align=left|
|align=left|
|- align=center
|Loss
|0-1
|align=left| Angel Rodriguez
|
|
|
|align=left|
|align=left|
|- align=center
|style="background:#ddd;"|NC
|
|align=left| Frank Hagney
|
|
|
|align=left|
|align=left|
|}

See also
Jack Dempsey vs. Luis Ángel Firpo
C.D. Luis Ángel Firpo -Football (soccer) team
List of Argentines
John Ruiz - First Hispanic world heavyweight champion
Andy Ruiz - Second Hispanic world Heavyweight champion

References

External links

 
 Gene Tunney's description of Firpo's multimillionaire success after retirement from the ring.
 22-9-1923, El Gráfico, Firpo vs. Dempsey
 Un KO di 17 secondi (IT) - Dempsey vs. Firpo, un "match" indimenticabile

1894 births
1960 deaths
Argentine male boxers
Heavyweight boxers
People from Junín, Buenos Aires
Sportspeople from Buenos Aires Province
Burials at La Recoleta Cemetery